St. Stephen's Beach is a secluded beach in the Southern District of Hong Kong, five minutes from Stanley Main Beach, and close to St. Stephen's College Preparatory School. The beach has barbecue pits. It is managed by the Leisure and Cultural Services Department and is rated as Grade 1 by the Environmental Protection Department for its water quality.

History
New beach facilities were opened by the Urban Council on 26 August 1966. A beach building was constructed with changing rooms, toilets and showers, a tuck shop, a catamaran store, a first aid post, and a picnic area with tables and chairs. An old pier was also rebuilt at the same time.

Features
 BBQ pits (14 nos.)
 Changing rooms
 Showers
 Toilets
 Tuck shop
 Water sports centre

See also
 Beaches of Hong Kong

References

External links 

 Official website
 Dopplr – St. Stephen's Beach and Military Cemetery

Stanley, Hong Kong
Beaches of Hong Kong